"Don't Drop It" is a song written and performed by Terry Fell (backing by The Fellers) and released on the "X" (RCA) label (catalog no. X-0010). In August 1954, it peaked at No. 4 on the Billboard country and western juke box chart and spent a total of 11 weeks on the charts. It was also ranked No. 17 on Billboards 1954 year-end country and western juke box chart.

See also
 Billboard Top Country & Western Records of 1954

References

American country music songs
1954 songs
Songs written by Terry Fell